The 2004–05 NBA season was the Kings' 56th season in the National Basketball Association, and their 20th season in Sacramento. The Kings struggled losing four of their first five games, but would then win 12 of their next 13 games. However, as the season progressed, the Kings would trade away their top players. Doug Christie was traded to the Orlando Magic for Cuttino Mobley in January, and All-Star forward Chris Webber was dealt to the Philadelphia 76ers for Kenny Thomas and former Kings' forward Corliss Williamson in February. Still, the Kings managed to finish second in the Pacific Division with a solid 50–32 record, clinching a sixth spot in the Western Conference. However, in the playoffs, the Kings failed to make it out of the first round, losing to the Seattle SuperSonics in five games. Following the season, Mobley signed as a free agent with the Los Angeles Clippers, and Bobby Jackson was traded to the Memphis Grizzlies.

Offseason

Draft picks

Roster

Regular season

Season standings

z – clinched division title
y – clinched division title
x – clinched playoff spot

Record vs. opponents

Game log

|-style="background:#fcc;"
| 1
| November 2
| @ Dallas
| 
| Brad Miller (24)
| Chris Webber (10)
| Mike Bibby (6)
| American Airlines Center20,041
| 0–1
|-style="background:#fcc;"
| 2
| November 3
| @ San Antonio
| 
| Mike Bibby (23)
| Chris Webber (9)
| Chris Webber (4)
| SBC Center18,797
| 0–2
|-style="background:#fcc;"
| 3
| November 6
| @ Houston
| 
| Mike Bibby (31)
| Chris Webber (13)
| Bibby, Webber (7)
| Toyota Center18,003
| 0–3
|-style="background:#cfc;"
| 4
| November 9
| Toronto
| 
| Miller, Webber (21)
| Brad Miller (12)
| Bibby, Webber (11)
| ARCO Arena17,317
| 1–3
|-style="background:#fcc;"
| 5
| November 10
| @ Seattle
| 
| Brad Miller (17)
| Brad Miller (9)
| Mike Bibby (5)
| KeyArena14,355
| 1–4
|-style="background:#cfc;"
| 6
| November 13
| @ Phoenix
| 
| Chris Webber (28)
| Chris Webber (10)
| Mike Bibby (7)
| America West Arena18,422
| 2–4
|-style="background:#cfc;"
| 7
| November 14
| Denver
| 
| Brad Miller (26)
| Miller, Webber (9)
| Bibby, Webber (5)
| ARCO Arena17,317
| 3–4
|-style="background:#cfc;"
| 8
| November 16
| Chicago
| 
| Peja Stojaković (29)
| Chris Webber (13)
| Chris Webber (6)
| ARCO Arena17,317
| 4–4
|-style="background:#cfc;"
| 9
| November 19
| Memphis
| 
| Chris Webber (31)
| Chris Webber (12)
| Doug Christie (9)
| ARCO Arena17,317
| 5–4
|-style="background:#cfc;"
| 10
| November 21
| Milwaukee
| 
| Peja Stojaković (21)
| Chris Webber (14)
| Doug Christie (6)
| ARCO Arena17,317
| 6–4
|-style="background:#cfc;"
| 11
| November 23
| Houston
| 
| Peja Stojaković (22)
| Mike Bibby (9)
| Mike Bibby (8)
| ARCO Arena17,317
| 7–4
|-style="background:#cfc;"
| 12
| November 26
| @ L.A. Lakers
| 
| Peja Stojaković (26)
| Chris Webber (16)
| Chris Webber (7)
| Staples Center18,997
| 8–4
|-style="background:#fcc;"
| 13
| November 28
| Minnesota
| 
| Chris Webber (25)
| Chris Webber (10)
| Mike Bibby (7)
| ARCO Aena17,317
| 8–5
|-style="background:#cfc;"
| 14
| November 30
| @ Memphis
| 
| Peja Stojaković (29)
| Chris Webber (11)
| Doug Christie (7)
| FedExForum14,192
| 9–5

|-style="background:#cfc;"
| 15
| December 1
| @ New Orleans
| 
| Brad Miller (24)
| Webber, Bibby (7)
| Chris Webber (9)
| New Orleans Arena12,133
| 10–5
|-style="background:#cfc;"
| 16
| December 3
| Indiana
| 
| Chris Webber (29)
| Brad Miller (13)
| Doug Christie (9)
| ARCO Arena17,317
| 11–5
|-style="background:#cfc;"
| 17
| December 5
| Boston
| 
| Peja Stojaković (27)
| Miller, Webber (10)
| Mike Bibby (10)
| ARCO Arena17,317
| 12–5
|-style="background:#cfc;"
| 18
| December 7
| Charlotte
| 
| Peja Stojaković (30)
| Peja Stojaković (12)
| Doug Christie (9)
| ARCO Arena17,317
| 13–5
|-style="background:#fcc;"
| 19
| December 10
| @ Minnesota
| 
| Chris Webber (25)
| Brad Miller (9)
| Bibby, Webber (7)
| Target Center19,101
| 13–6
|-style="background:#cfc;"
| 20
| December 11
| @ Indiana
| 
| Chris Webber (26)
| Brad Miller (13)
| Brad Miller (7)
| Conseco Fieldhouse17,091
| 14–6
|-style="background:#cfc;"
| 21
| December 14
| @ Milwaukee
| 
| Mike Bibby (27)
| Brad Miller (11)
| Mike Bibby (9)
| Bradley Center13,687
| 15–6
|-style="background:#fcc;"
| 22
| December 16
| L.A. Lakers
| 
| Chris Webber (20)
| Darius Songaila (10)
| Doug Christie (7)
| ARCO Arena17,317
| 15–7
|-style="background:#cfc;"
| 23
| December 19
| New Orleans
| 
| Peja Stojaković (21)
| Darius Songaila (11)
| Christie, Miller (6)
| ARCO Arena17,317
| 16–7
|-style="background:#cfc;"
| 24
| December 21
| Washington
| 
| Peja Stojaković (26)
| Chris Webber (10)
| Doug Christie (9)
| ARCO Arena17,317
| 17–7
|-style="background:#fcc;"
| 25
| December 23
| Miami
| 
| Chris Webber (26)
| Greg Ostertag (10)
| Mike Bibby (8)
| ARCO Arena17,317
| 17–8
|-style="background:#fcc;"
| 26
| December 26
| Golden State
| 
| Chris Webber (28)
| Brad Miller (13)
| Brad Miller (7)
| ARCO Arena17,317
| 17–9
|-style="background:#cfc;"
| 27
| December 31
| @ Utah
| 
| Peja Stojaković (26)
| Brad Miller (10)
| Mike Bibby (9)
| Delta Center19,911
| 18–9

|-style="background:#cfc;"
| 28
| January 2
| San Antonio
| 
| Peja Stojaković (28)
| Chris Webber (13)
| Chris Webber (7)
| ARCO Arena17,317
| 19–9
|-style="background:#cfc;"
| 29
| January 4
| @ New York
| 
| Chris Webber (22)
| Chris Webber (11)
| Mike Bibby (7)
| Madison Square Garden19,763
| 20–9
|-style="background:#fcc;"
| 30
| January 5
| @ Toronto
| 
| Mike Bibby (32)
| Brad Miller (19)
| Chris Webber (6)
| Air Canada Centre18,288
| 20–10
|-style="background:#cfc;"
| 31
| January 7
| @ Atlanta
| 
| Mike Bibby (31)
| Chris Webber (8)
| Mike Bibby (6)
| Philips Arena13,626
| 21–10
|-style="background:#fcc;"
| 32
| January 8
| @ New Orleans
| 
| Peja Stojaković (37)
| Brad Miller (16)
| Mike Bibby (8)
| New Orleans Arena14,635
| 21–11
|-style="background:#cfc;"
| 33
| January 11
| Denver
| 
| Peja Stojaković (27)
| Miller, Songaila (8)
| Mike Bibby (7)
| ARCO Arena17,317
| 22–11
|-style="background:#cfc;"
| 34
| January 13
| Utah
| 
| Peja Stojaković (27)
| Chris Webber (15)
| Miller, Webber, Barnes (4)
| ARCO Arena17,317
| 23–11
|-style="background:#cfc;"
| 35
| January 15
| L.A. Clippers
| 
| Chris Webber (36)
| Chris Webber (10)
| Mike Bibby (8)
| ARCO Arena17,317
| 24–11
|-style="background:#cfc;"
| 36
| January 17
| @ L.A. Clippers
| 
| Chris Webber (23)
| Chris Webber (14)
| Chris Webber (6)
| Staples Center17,139
| 25–11
|-style="background:#cfc;"
| 37
| January 18
| Portland
| 
| Chris Webber (32)
| Chris Webber (13)
| Mike Bibby (9)
| ARCO Arena17,317
| 26–11
|-style="background:#cfc;"
| 38
| January 20
| Cleveland
| 
| Chris Webber (27)
| Chris Webber (13)
| Mike Bibby (11)
| ARCO Arena17,317
| 27–11
|-style="background:#fcc;"
| 39
| January 23
| San Antonio
| 
| Mike Bibby (13)
| Brad Miller (14)
| Greg Ostertag (3)
| ARCO Arena17,317
| 27–12
|-style="background:#cfc;"
| 40
| January 25
| New Jersey
| 
| Brad Miller (31)
| Brad Miller (12)
| Mobley, Bibby (10)
| ARCO Arena17,317
| 28–12
|-style="background:#fcc;"
| 41
| January 27
| @ San Antonio
| 
| Brad Miller (19)
| Chris Webber (8)
| Bibby, Webber (6)
| SBC Center18,797
| 28–13
|-style="background:#cfc;"
| 42
| January 28
| @ Houston
| 
| Chris Webber (30)
| Brad Miller (14)
| Mike Bibby (14)
| Toyota Center18,191
| 29–13
|-style="background:#cfc;"
| 43
| January 30
| @ Minnesota
| 
| Brad Miller (27)
| Brad Miller (15)
| Mike Bibby (8)
| Target Center18,722
| 30–13

|-style="background:#fcc;"
| 44
| February 1
| Seattle
| 
| Mike Bibby (25)
| Matt Barnes (8)
| Brad Miller (6)
| ARCO Arena17,317
| 30–14
|-style="background:#cfc;"
| 45
| February 2
| @ Golden State
| 
| Brad Miller (38)
| Brad Miller (17)
| Mike Bibby (11)
| The Arena in Oakland17,347
| 31–14
|-style="background:#cfc;"
| 46
| February 4
| New York
| 
| Mike Bibby (40)
| Brad Miller (9)
| Mike Bibby (7)
| ARCO Arena17,317
| 32–14
|-style="background:#fcc;"
| 47
| February 5
| @ Portland
| 
| Mike Bibby (35)
| Chris Webber (13)
| Chris Webber (10)
| Rose Garden19,002
| 32–15
|-style="background:#fcc;"
| 48
| February 8
| Phoenix
| 
| Mike Bibby (27)
| Webber, Miller (10)
| Chris Webber (12)
| ARCO Arena17,317
| 32–16
|-style="background:#fcc;"
| 49
| February 10
| @ Seattle
| 
| Peja Stojaković (28)
| Chris Webber (9)
| Chris Webber (9)
| KeyArena16,629
| 32–17
|-style="background:#fcc;"
| 50
| February 11
| Dallas
| 
| Mike Bibby (25)
| Chris Webber (11)
| Bibby, Webber, Miller,Mobley, Barnes (4)
| ARCO Arena17,317
| 32–18
|-style="background:#cfc;"
| 51
| February 13
| @ Boston
| 
| Mike Bibby (27)
| Chris Webber (17)
| Chris Webber (12)
| FleetCenter14,252
| 33–18
|-style="background:#fcc;"
| 52
| February 15
| @ Chicago
| 
| Brad Miller (23)
| Miller, Webber (9)
| Bibby, Miller (7)
| United Center21,789
| 33–19
|-style="background:#fcc;"
| 53
| February 16
| @ New Jersey
| 
| Mike Bibby (25)
| Chris Webber (10)
| Miller, Webber (5)
| Continental Airlines Arena12,227
| 33–20
|-style="background:#cfc;"
| 54
| February 22
| Atlanta
| 
| Chris Webber (30)
| Brad Miller (14)
| Miller, Webber, Bibby (7)
| ARCO Arena17,317
| 34–20
|-style="background:#fcc;"
| 55
| February 24
| @ Dallas
| 
| Mobley, Bibby (26)
| Brad Miller (15)
| Mike Bibby (8)
| American Airlines Center20,377
| 34–21
|-style="background:#cfc;"
| 56
| February 26
| @ Philadelphia
| 
| Mike Bibby (19)
| Kenny Thomas (10)
| Mike Bibby (8)
| Wachovia Center21,068
| 35–21
|-style="background:#cfc;"
| 57
| February 27
| @ Washington
| 
| Mike Bibby (38)
| Kenny Thomas (12)
| Mike Bibby (7)
| MCI Center20,173
| 36–21

|-style="background:#fcc;"
| 58
| March 1
| @ Charlotte
| 
| Corliss Williamson (18)
| Brian Skinner (16)
| Mike Bibby (4)
| Charlotte Coliseum11,790
| 36–22
|-style="background:#fcc;"
| 59
| March 2
| @ Orlando
| 
| Peja Stojaković (28)
| Darius Songaila (7)
| Mike Bibby (10)
| TD Waterhouse Centre13,568
| 36–23
|-style="background:#fcc;"
| 60
| March 4
| @ Miami
| 
| Mike Bibby (22)
| Brian Skinner (11)
| Mike Bibby (7)
| American Airlines Arena20,122
| 36–24
|-style="background:#cfc;"
| 61
| March 6
| Detroit
| 
| Mike Bibby (19)
| Brian Skinner (12)
| Mike Bibby (11)
| ARCO Arena17,317
| 37–24
|-style="background:#cfc;"
| 62
| March 8
| Memphis
| 
| Mike Bibby (26)
| Maurice Evans (14)
| Mike Bibby (5)
| ARCO Arena17,317
| 38–24
|-style="background:#cfc;"
| 63
| March 11
| L.A. Clippers
| 
| Mike Bibby (28)
| Skinner, Thomas (9)
| Mike Bibby (12)
| ARCO Arena17,317
| 39–24
|-style="background:#fcc;"
| 64
| March 13
| Houston
| 
| Peja Stojaković (21)
| Brian Skinner (11)
| Mike Bibby (12)
| ARCO Arena17,317
| 39–25
|-style="background:#cfc;"
| 65
| March 15
| Orlando
| 
| Peja Stojaković (27)
| Brian Skinner (11)
| Mike Bibby (10)
| ARCO Arena17,317
| 40–25
|-style="background:#fcc;"
| 66
| March 17
| @ Golden State
| 
| Cuttino Mobley (28)
| Brian Skinner (11)
| Mike Bibby (8)
| The Arena in Oakland17,836
| 40–26
|-style="background:#cfc;"
| 67
| March 19
| @ L.A. Clippers
| 
| Stojaković, Mobley (24)
| Brian Skinner (9)
| Mike Bibby (6)
| Staples Center19,816
| 41–26
|-style="background:#fcc;"
| 68
| March 20
| Golden State
| 
| Mike Bibby (24)
| Darius Songaila (9)
| Mike Bibby (8)
| ARCO Arena17,317
| 41–27
|-style="background:#cfc;"
| 69
| March 22
| Portland
| 
| Kenny Thomas (24)
| Kenny Thomas (9)
| Mike Bibby (10)
| ARCO Arena17,317
| 42–27
|-style="background:#cfc;"
| 70
| March 24
| Dallas
| 
| Peja Stojaković (38)
| Peja Stojaković (9)
| Mike Bibby (8)
| ARCO Arena17,317
| 43–27
|-style="background:#fcc;"
| 71
| March 26
| @ Denver
| 
| Peja Stojaković (24)
| Brian Skinner (8)
| Kenny Thomas (5)
| Pepsi Center19,729
| 43–28
|-style="background:#cfc;"
| 72
| March 28
| Philadelphia
| 
| Cuttino Mobley (30)
| Brian Skinner (19)
| Mobley, Skinner, Bibby (5)
| ARCO Arena17,317
| 44–28
|-style="background:#fcc;"
| 73
| March 30
| @ Detroit
| 
| Mike Bibby (26)
| Kenny Thomas (11)
| Mike Bibby (8)
| The Palace of Auburn Hills22,076
| 44–29

|-style="background:#cfc;"
| 74
| April 1
| @ Cleveland
| 
| Mobley, Bibby, Stojaković (22)
| Thomas, Evans (8)
| Mike Bibby (9)
| Gund Arena20,562
| 45–29
|-style="background:#fcc;"
| 75
| April 3
| Minnesota
| 
| Peja Stojaković (25)
| Kenny Thomas (16)
| Mike Bibby (4)
| ARCO Arena17,317
| 45–30
|-style="background:#cfc;"
| 76
| April 5
| Seattle
| 
| Peja Stojaković (24)
| Kenny Thomas (8)
| Mike Bibby (10)
| ARCO Arena17,317
| 46–30
|-style="background:#cfc;"
| 77
| April 8
| @ Portland
| 
| Peja Stojaković (35)
| Brian Skinner (16)
| Mike Bibby (11)
| Rose Garden17,539
| 47–30
|-style="background:#cfc;"
| 78
| April 10
| L.A. Lakers
| 
| Kenny Thomas (32)
| Kenny Thomas (14)
| Mike Bibby (8)
| ARCO Arena17,317
| 48–30
|-style="background:#cfc;"
| 79
| April 15
| @ L.A. Lakers
| 
| Mike Bibby (26)
| Kenny Thomas (9)
| Cuttino Mobley (10)
| Staples Center18,997
| 49–30
|-style="background:#fcc;"
| 80
| April 16
| @ Phoenix
| 
| Eddie House (17)
| Thomas, Ostertag (8)
| Bibby, Ostertag (5)
| America West Arena18,422
| 49–31
|-style="background:#fcc;"
| 81
| April 18
| @ Utah
| 
| Mike Bibby (26)
| Darius Songaila (11)
| Mike Bibby (6)
| Delta Center18,603
| 49–32
|-style="background:#cfc;"
| 82
| April 20
| Phoenix
| 
| Mobley, Williamson, Songaila (19)
| Greg Ostertag (10)
| Kenny Thomas (8)
| ARCO Arena17,317
| 50–32

Playoffs

|- align="center" bgcolor="#ffcccc"
| 1
| April 23
| @ Seattle
| L 82–87
| Peja Stojaković (24)
| Kenny Thomas (8)
| Mike Bibby (4)
| KeyArena17,072
| 0–1
|- align="center" bgcolor="#ffcccc"
| 2
| April 26
| @ Seattle
| L 93–105
| Bobby Jackson (17)
| Peja Stojaković (10)
| Mike Bibby (8)
| KeyArena17,072
| 0–2
|- align="center" bgcolor="#ccffcc"
| 3
| April 29
| Seattle
| W 116–104
| Mike Bibby (31)
| Bibby, Thomas (7)
| Mike Bibby (4)
| ARCO Arena17,317
| 1–2
|- align="center" bgcolor="#ffcccc"
| 4
| May 1
| Seattle
| L 102–115
| Peja Stojaković (25)
| Kenny Thomas (14)
| Mike Bibby (7)
| ARCO Arena17,317
| 1–3
|- align="center" bgcolor="#ffcccc"
| 5
| May 3
| @ Seattle
| L 118–122
| Peja Stojaković (38)
| Miller, Thomas (6)
| Brad Miller (11)
| KeyArena17,072
| 1–4
|-

Player statistics

Season

†Traded during the season
≠Acquired during the season

Playoffs

Awards and records

Transactions

References

See also
 2004–05 NBA season

Sacramento Kings seasons
Sacramento
Sacramento
Sacramento